Peter Romero may refer to:

Peter F. Romero, American diplomat
Peter R. Romero (1920–2010), art director